Boćwinka  is a village in the administrative district of Gmina Kruklanki, within Giżycko County, Warmian-Masurian Voivodeship, in north-eastern Poland. It is located in the region of Masuria.

History
The origins of the village date back to 1554, when Łukasz Lipiński bought land to establish a village. In 1860, the village had a population of 354.

References

Villages in Giżycko County
1554 establishments in Poland
Populated places established in 1554